Christine Frances Quinlan (born May 7, 1986) is an American singer-songwriter, guitarist and visual artist best known for fronting Philadelphia indie rock band Hop Along. They have painted all the band's album art.

Career

Early life
Quinlan was raised in northern New Jersey and Quakertown, Pennsylvania, and was an active reader in their youth.  

Their parents, whom they have described as "big music fans", introduced them to artists such as Bob Dylan, Cat Stevens, and The Kinks at an early age. They initially attempted to learn to play the electric guitar at age 13, but became frustrated and gave up. However, after their brother Andrew introduced them to musicians such as Ani DiFranco, Fiona Apple, and Lauryn Hill, they revisited the instrument and were more successful. They began songwriting and working on musical projects with their brother. They worked as a house painter during this time.

Musical career
In the mid-2000s, Quinlan began a solo acoustic project in college at Maryland Institute College of Art. During this time, they released their debut EP, Songs of the Sea. 

Quinlan recorded their first solo album, Freshman Year, under the name Hop Along, Queen Ansleis, in 2005, between their freshman and sophomore years. They distributed the album on burned CDs. After graduation, another brother, Mark, joined them on drums as they continued the project, which was renamed Hop Along. Hop Along's 2015 studio album Painted Shut was widely praised by critics for its "immediacy and emotional depth", led by Quinlan's voice. Quinlan lived in Philadelphia in the mid-2010s, where they wrote the lyrics of the band's next album, Bark Your Head Off, Dog.

Quinlan's debut solo album, Likewise was released on January 31, 2020 through Saddle Creek Records. Hop Along guitarist Joe Reinhart appears on the album performing guitar and bass. Quinlan created the album's cover art, as they have done for every prior album released under Hop Along.

Personal life
Quinlan came out as non-binary through a thread of tweets on January 22, 2021. They revealed that they chose to start going by their middle name after high school in an attempt to distance themselves from a role they claimed to have never "understood or felt agency with". Quinlan's pronouns are they/them.

In between tours, Quinlan works at a housepainting business owned by their aunt.

Discography

Studio albums
 Likewise (2020)

References

Further reading

External links 

 

1986 births
Maryland Institute College of Art alumni
Singers from New Jersey
People from Quakertown, Pennsylvania
Saddle Creek Records artists
Living people
Guitarists from New Jersey
Singers from Pennsylvania
Guitarists from Pennsylvania
Songwriters from New Jersey
Songwriters from Pennsylvania
21st-century American singers
21st-century American guitarists
Non-binary musicians